USS Goldcrest is the name of three U.S. Navy warships:

 , a minesweeper commissioned in 1940 and renamed Agate
 , a steel merchant trawler built as Shawmut in 1928 by Bethlehem Shipbuilding Corporation's Fore River Shipyard in Quincy, Massachusetts
 , was laid down 31 August 1944

United States Navy ship names